Louise Gigi Gaston is an American writer-director.

Early in her life, Gaston was noted in the New York Times as an equestrian in 1977, and she pursued a career in Olympic Equestrian Show jumping.

Gaston has written and sold many screenplays, including Like a Lady,  Mockingbird, to Steve Tisch and New Line Cinema, and Madame Lupescue to Ron Howard for a large six-figure sum in 1996.

Her documentary The Cream Will Rise (1998) discussed singer/songwriter Sophie B. Hawkins's early years, played at film festivals and was well reviewed in Variety.

Gaston directed the music video for Olivia Newton-John's updated "I Honestly Love You".  Gaston directed the 2001 heist film Beyond the City Limits (Rip It Off) with Nastassja Kinski, Alyson Hannigan and Jennifer Esposito, which received mixed reviews.  In 2008, Gaston directed the documentary We Will Not Be Silenced about alleged irregularities in the caucuses for the 2008 Democratic party presidential primaries. Though Gaston is a devote Democrat.  Her great Grandfather, Mayor of Boston and Governor of Mass, the doc was only discussed in "right of center" blogs and media outlets such as Fox and Friends and others.

In 2012, she wrote and directed the play Room 105: The Highs and Lows of Janis Joplin, featuring Sophie B. Hawkins as Joplin. It opened on October 4, the anniversary of Joplin's death, and its run was extended. It was described as "impressively written and directed" and "a joy" in EDGE Los Angeles, and received good reviews elsewhere.

Her film Alone Together based on her mother's  book Alone Together by Theodora Getty Gaston, a tragic love story to Wark Entertainment where it is being filmed starting January 2018.

The film 9 Bullets, inspired by her close friendship with the burlesque performer Gypsy Rose Lee and starring Lena Headey, Sam Worthington, and Dean Scott Vazquez, was released in April 2022 by Screen Media.

References

External links 
 
 The Cream Will Rise  Official site.
 We Will Not Be Silenced Official site.

Living people
American lesbian writers
American documentary filmmakers
American women documentary filmmakers
Year of birth missing (living people)
21st-century American women writers